William John Virgin (16 December 1905 – 18 October 1997) was a serving Major in the former Indian Medical Service in British India. He was the first Principal of Dhaka Medical College. Virgin was born in Toronto, Canada on 16 December 1905. He served primarily in India and, after its formation, Bangladesh.

Career
The University of Toronto in June 1933 conferred on Virgin the degree Doctor of Medicine.

He was an orthopedic surgeon by profession. He joined the Indian Medical Service, where he was promoted to Lieutenant on 1 August 1933 [on prob], and Captain on 1 August 1934 [on prob] (17/2/36). He received a promotion to the post of Major on 1 August 1943. He was posted in Dhaka from 1943 to 1947, where he was appointed as the Civil Surgeon of Dhaka.

Virgin was made the head of the committee to establish a medical college in Dhaka. Dhaka Medical College was started on 10 July 1946, and Virgin was made its founding principal, as well as the first superintendent of the Dhaka Medical College Hospital. He also served as the first ever Dean of Faculty of Medicine at the University of Dhaka. On 21 December 1946, Virgin succeeded Major F. H. A. L. Davidson, IMS, as the medical officer of Dhaka Central Jail.

Virgin served as the principal of Dhaka Medical College and Hospital until 14 August 1947. Later, he joined the department of orthopedic surgery of the University of Liverpool as a senior research fellow.

Later in life, he wrote a book on his experience in India titled The India I Knew: Experiences of a Canadian Orthopaedic Surgeon over 50 Years, which was published in 1988.

Personal life
In 1934, Virgin married Zelma Crone, with whom he had five children. He died in Toronto on 18 October 1997 at the age of 91.

References

Indian Medical Service officers
Academic staff of Dhaka Medical College and Hospital
Academic staff of the University of Dhaka
University of Toronto alumni
Canadian orthopedic surgeons
1905 births
1997 deaths
Canadian people in British India
Canadian expatriates in England